Coleophora gulinovi is a moth of the family Coleophoridae. It is found in Ukraine.

References

gulinovi
Moths described in 1991
Moths of Europe